Datuk Cheah Soon Kit (Current name:  / Birth name)  (born 9 January 1968) is a former Malaysian badminton player and coach.

Career 
Known for his amazing jumping smashes, Soon Kit was one of the top doubles stars in the world in his heyday. He won the Olympic silver with Yap Kim Hock in Atlanta 1996. Before combining with Kim Hock, Soon Kit’s partner was Soo Beng Kiang and they won numerous international titles, including the 1992 and 1994 World Cup. He was also a vital member of the Malaysian squad that won the Thomas Cup for the first time in 25 years, in a 3-2 victory over Indonesia at the Stadium Negara in 1992.

Coaching 
Soon Kit was the national women’s doubles coach from 2001 to 2007. He groomed Wong Pei Tty-Chin Eei Hui into the country’s top pair. Pei Tty-Eei Hui bagged the SEA Games gold in Manila in 2005 to end a 30-year title drought. They also won the gold at the 2006 Commonwealth Games in Melbourne. After becoming the head coach for several minor badminton clubs, Soon Kit rejoined the national set-up in 2016 before heading the men’s doubles department in 2017 and was instrumental in grooming the current Malaysia No.1 Aaron Chia-Soh Wooi Yik. He left the national setup at the end of 2018.

Achievements

Olympic Games 
Men's doubles

World Championships 
Men's doubles

World Cup 
Men's doubles

Asian Games 
Men's doubles

Asian Championships 
Men's doubles

Asian Cup 
Men's doubles

Southeast Asian Games 
Men's doubles

Mixed doubles

Commonwealth Games 
Men's doubles

IBF World Grand Prix 
The World Badminton Grand Prix sanctioned by International Badminton Federation (IBF) from 1983 to 2006.

Men's doubles

IBF International 
Men's doubles

Honours

Honours of Malaysia 
  :
  Herald of the Order of Loyalty to the Royal Family of Malaysia (BSD) (1988)
  Officer of the Order of the Defender of the Realm (KMN) (1992)
  :
  Knight Commander of the Order of the Territorial Crown (PMW) – Datuk (2021)

References

External links 
 
 
 

1968 births
Living people
People from Ipoh
Malaysian sportspeople of Chinese descent
Malaysian male badminton players
Badminton players at the 1992 Summer Olympics
Badminton players at the 1996 Summer Olympics
Badminton players at the 2000 Summer Olympics
Olympic badminton players of Malaysia
Olympic silver medalists for Malaysia
Olympic medalists in badminton
Medalists at the 1996 Summer Olympics
Badminton players at the 1990 Commonwealth Games
Badminton players at the 1994 Commonwealth Games
Badminton players at the 1998 Commonwealth Games
Commonwealth Games gold medallists for Malaysia
Commonwealth Games silver medallists for Malaysia
Commonwealth Games medallists in badminton
Badminton players at the 1986 Asian Games
Badminton players at the 1990 Asian Games
Badminton players at the 1994 Asian Games
Asian Games silver medalists for Malaysia
Asian Games bronze medalists for Malaysia
Asian Games medalists in badminton
Medalists at the 1990 Asian Games
Medalists at the 1994 Asian Games
Competitors at the 1987 Southeast Asian Games
Competitors at the 1989 Southeast Asian Games
Competitors at the 1991 Southeast Asian Games
Competitors at the 1993 Southeast Asian Games
Competitors at the 1995 Southeast Asian Games
Competitors at the 1997 Southeast Asian Games
Southeast Asian Games gold medalists for Malaysia
Southeast Asian Games silver medalists for Malaysia
Southeast Asian Games bronze medalists for Malaysia
Southeast Asian Games medalists in badminton
World No. 1 badminton players
Badminton coaches
Heralds of the Order of Loyalty to the Royal Family of Malaysia
Officers of the Order of the Defender of the Realm
Medallists at the 1990 Commonwealth Games
Medallists at the 1994 Commonwealth Games
Medallists at the 1998 Commonwealth Games